= History of the Franks =

History of the Franks may refer to:

- The history of the Franks, a confederation of Germanic tribes
- Historia Francorum, a book written by Gregory of Tours
